Rade Bogdanović (Serbian Cyrillic: Раде Богдановић; born 21 May 1970) is a Serbian former professional footballer who played as a striker.

Early life
Born in Sarajevo to a father employed as a driver at Energoinvest and a homemaker mother, Bogdanović was raised in the suburb of Tilava. He attended the  Primary School in the Vraca neighbourhood and was a fan of Hajduk Split in his youth.

Youth football at FK Željezničar
The youngster began playing organized football at the age of twelve, getting invited to try out for hometown FK Željezničar's youth system in June 1982 after being noticed at a local primary school tournament by the club scout and former goalkeeper Ruda Bulić. After passing the tryout, Bogdanović was attached to the Željezničar cadet (under-16) squad coached by Duško Bajić; among the youngsters joining the club's youth system at the same time was Goran Gutalj.

Progressing up the age groups within Željezničar's youth system, Bogdanović was coached by Josip Bukal, then Sulejman Kulović, and finally Vasilije "Čiko" Radović.

By spring 1987, the teenager was set to make his full squad debut away at NK Osijek on 24 May 1987 due to Edin Ćurić serving a one-match suspension for an accumulation of yellow cards. However, a medial collateral ligament (MCL) injury sustained four days earlier during the SR Bosnia-Herzegovina provincial youth (under-18) cup final versus FK Sarajevo under-18s forced Bogdanović into a six-month layoff that included surgery followed by months of regaining match fitness.

Club career

FK Željezničar
Recovered from knee injury and surgery, teenage Bogdanović was attached to the Željezničar full squad under head coach Blagoje Bratić in January 1988, joining players such as Dragan Škrba, Branislav Berjan, Mirsad Baljić, Vlado Komšić, Edin Bahtić, Edin Ćurić, Zoran Slišković, Edim Hadžialagić, Radmilo Mihajlović, and Milan Pavlović with the team stuck in the bottom half of the table throughout the league season. Three years removed from its storied UEFA Cup run—with goalkeeper Škrba, full backs Berjan and Baljić, midfielder Ćurić, returnee midfielder Bahtić, and forward Mihajlović as the holdovers from the great season—Željezničar was struggling to replicate that success.

The seventeen-year-old defensive midfielder was given his debut on 27 March 1988 at Titograd's Pod Goricom Stadium in a Yugoslav First League match away at Budućnost. Entering the contest in the 65th minute with visiting Željezničar up 0-1, Bogdanović was brought on in an effort of protecting the lead, however, the match ended 1-1 as Dejan Savićević tied the score for the home team. One week after making his league debut in Titograd, the youngster was given a start by coach Bratić at home versus Hajduk and managed to score a spectacular goal, Željo's third, on Hajduk's goalie Zoran Varvodić as the rampant Željezničar squad routed the struggling visitors 3-0.

Over the summer 1988 transfer window, head coach Bratić got replaced by his assistant Josip Bukal as Željezničar underwent a squad overhaul with the team's twenty-three-year-old star striker Mihajlović sold to Dinamo Zagreb, its best defender—twenty-six-year-old left back Baljić—sold to FC Sion, and its thirty-four-year-old veteran right back Berjan moving on to Karlstad BK in the Sweden second division after fourteen seasons at Grbavica. The departures opened up more space for the team's youth system prospects—including Bogdanović, Suvad Katana, Siniša Nikolić, Srećko Ilić, and Mario Stanić—who had already been set to start getting regular first team opportunities. The offseason also saw the return to the club of the thirty-two-year-old fan-favourite veteran Nikola Nikić after four seasons abroad as well as the acquisition of young winger Simo Krunić from the Second League team Famos Hrasnica.

In 1990, twenty-year-old Bogdanović got called up to serve his mandatory Yugoslav People's Army (JNA) service. Serving in Belgrade at the Topčider barracks as part of the sporting company, a unit formed for professional athletes, among the athletes serving at the same time was Vladan Milojević, a Red Star Belgrade prospect who would go on to a notable head coaching career. As a result of being in the army, Bogdanović missed the entire 1990-91 league season.

Bogdanović stayed at Grbavica until April 1992, fleeing Sarajevo as the Bosnian War broke out. The twenty-two-year-old fled to Belgrade along with several other Željezničar first team players such as Simo Krunić, Gordan Vidović, Suvad Katana, Siniša Nikolić, Srećko Ilić, and Jasminko Velić. Once in Serbia, they were accommodated by the FK Partizan technical director Nenad Bjeković and general secretary Žarko Zečević who took care of the players' basic living needs by putting them up at Hotel Mladost near the Banjica forest while allowing them to take part in FK Partizan's training sessions in order to maintain fitness while looking for new clubs. Within months, Krunić started playing with OFK Beograd, Nikolić found a club in Portuguese lower divisions, Ilić moved to Slovenian NK Mura, Gutalj also eventually ended up at Mura after not passing his trial in Korea while Katana ended up at K.R.C. Genk in Belgium and Vidović moved to Switzerland's FC St. Gallen.

South Korea
Though having a verbal agreement with Bjeković about signing with FK Partizan ahead of the upcoming season, in June 1992, Bogdanović moved to the Far East, joining the South Korean club POSCO Atoms from Pohang midway through the 1992 K League season. Initially arriving on a month-long trial, Bogdanović appeared in eight competitive matches before the Pohang Iron and Steel Company-owned club offered him a full contract, which he accepted. The terms of his deal in Korea included receiving a US$120,000 advance along with a US$5,000 monthly salary plus achievement-based bonuses. 

Playing in the modest league consisting of only six teams, he quickly established himself as one of its best players. Though spending the initial four years of his professional career in the Yugoslav First League with Željezničar as a defensive midfielder, Bogdanović started being deployed as a striker upon arriving to Korea. With the Yugoslav up front and twenty-three-year-old Korean rising star Hong Myung-bo in defence, POSCO Atoms edged out Ilhwa Chunma from Seongnam to win the 1992 K League title.

At the end of the 1994 K League season, Bogdanović made the league top eleven squad as the best forward in the competition.

After completing the 1996 K League season in early November 1996 as the Pohang Steelers failed to qualify for the league championship playoff, Bogdanović signed with the Japanese J.League side JEF United Ichihara for the following season. Before leaving the Pohang Steelers for good, he played for the team at the start of the 1996–97 Asian Club Championship in late November 1996.

Japan and failed transfer to Ajax
In mid-November 1996, after spending four and a half seasons at Pohang, Bogdanović signed with the Japanese club JEF United Ichihara from Chiba, citing better pay and higher level of competition in the Japanese league as motivation for the move. Bidding his farewell to Pohang upon appearing in three round-robin matches at the start of the 1996–97 Asian Club Championship, he went back home to Belgrade to await the commencement of the upcoming J.League season. 

While in Belgrade, the player received a dream offer from Louis van Gaal's Ajax, reigning Dutch champions and Champions League finalists. Traveling to Amsterdam with his wife, along with the Serbian sports journalist Mile Vjetrović who was brought along for translation, Bogdanović met with van Gaal and was one of the guests of the club for its league derby match versus PSV Eindhoven on 22 December 1996 at the recently-opened Amsterdam Arena. Seeing it as a chance to finally come back to Europe, the twenty-six-year-old Yugoslav decided to sign for the Amsterdam club in late December 1996 without making them aware that he had already committed to JEF. After signing a preliminary agreement with Ajax, Bogdanović arrived at the Dutch team for a January 1997 trial that included joining their winter training in La Manga, Spain during the Eredivisie winter break. Bogdanović was hoping for a compensation agreement with JEF that would allow him to go stay with Ajax's talented squad featuring Edwin van der Sar, Danny Blind, Winston Bogarde, de Boer brothers (Frank and Ronald), Richard Witschge, Marc Overmars, Tijani Babangida, Jari Litmanen, and Patrick Kluivert, but the UEFA arbitration committee got involved and the twenty-six-year-old was forced to honour the contract he had signed in Japan. Unbeknownst to Bogdanović at the time, while training with Ajax in La Manga, he was noticed by the Atlético Madrid assistant coach Rešad Kunovac who was there on a scouting trip assessing the Dutch team, his club's next opponent at the upcoming Champions League quarterfinals.

Begrudgingly going back to the Far East, Bogdanović spent five months with JEF alongside compatriot Nenad Maslovar, playing the first part of the 1997 J1 League season.

Return to Europe: Atlético Madrid, Breda loan
During summer 1997, Bogdanović's wish of returning to Europe finally came true as compatriot Radomir Antić signed him to a contract with the Spanish club Atlético Madrid on a squad featuring fellow Yugoslavs Milinko Pantić and Veljko Paunović—along with a slew of high-profile players such as the expensive new signings Christian Vieri and Juninho Paulista, additional new signings Daniel Prodan, Andrei Frascarelli, Jordi Lardín, José Mari, and veteran returnee Paulo Futre as well as established holdovers from the club's league-and-cup-winning double two seasons earlier Kiko, Toni Muñoz, José Luis Caminero, Santi Denia, José Francisco Molina, and Juan Vizcaíno. Arriving to Madrid, Bogdanović's living accommodations were taken care by the club that arranged for him to move into the apartment owned by Diego Simeone who had just gotten sold to Inter Milan. Moving into the apartment complex, Bogdanović became neighbours with fellow Yugoslav professional athlete, basketball player Dejan Bodiroga, who had been playing for Real Madrid Baloncesto.

After not being included in the squad for the opening day of the league season away at Real Madrid, Bogdanović made his debut in the week 2, partnering Kiko up front at home versus Real Valladolid on 6 September 1997 and scoring two first half goals as los Colchoneros routed the visitors 5–0 by the end. The dream start prompted Atlético's impulsive president Jesús Gil to buy him a brand new BMW 316i as a reward. However, the presence of Vieri and Kiko meant few playing opportunities for Bogdanović: in the very next league match, 1-0 away loss at Athletic Bilbao, he was reduced to only twelve minutes of action plus injury time, coming on for Vieri in the 78nd minute, followed by four league contests completely out of the matchday lineup. 

Bogdanović would reappear in late October 1997 for a 0-2 home loss versus Espanyol with another full 90 minute performance next to Kiko as Vieri was given a rest by head coach Antić following the Italian's UEFA Cup hat-trick versus PAOK four days earlier. With Atlético taking a 5-2 advantage into the return leg in Thessaloniki, Vieri was again rested by Antić while Bogdanović started and got a goal in the high-scoring contest that ended 4-4, his very first European continental club match. 

Back on La Liga front, Vieri got injured minutes into the next league match, at home versus relegation-battlers Compostela, with Bogdanović coming on and scoring before making way for Vizcaíno at halftime. Due to Vieri's injury, Bogdanović would continue as a starter for the following five league matches, a period during which the Yugoslav scored twice. Vieri returned from injury in mid December 1997 as the fourth-placed los Colchoneros were taking on Mallorca and immediately got his starting centre forward assignment back, but could manage only 45 minutes as Antić sent on Bogdanović at halftime with the visitors leading 1-2—within minutes of entering, the Yugoslav tied the score 2-2, but Mallorca still managed to win by the end 2-3. Three days later, with Vieri still not fully recovered, Bogdanović began the league match versus league-leaders FC Barcelona at Camp Nou in front of 80,000 spectators before being subbed off fifteen minutes into the second half with the score tied at 1-1; Barça won 3-1 by the end, dropping Atlético to sixth in the table.

By early January 1998, Vieri was fully match fit again and Bogdanović was back to getting the Italian's leftover minutes. In the wake of picking up an injury that forced him to leave the mid January 1998 league match away at Valladolid before halftime, and a diagnosis by the Atlético medical staff that he would be out of action for at least six months, the Yugoslav accepted a loan out to Dutch NAC Breda for the remainder of the season in order to free up a spot on the Atlético's roster for another attacking player, Avi Nimni, to be registered.

Werder Bremen
After playing out the 1997–98 season on loan in Eredivisie, Bogdanović came back to Atlético in summer 1998. As a consequence of finishing the preceding La Liga season in disappointing 7th spot, the Madrid club management undertook a major squad rebuilding effort during the offseason with coach Radomir Antić fired and Arrigo Sacchi brought in. The coaching change was accompanied with a host of changes in player personnel such as superstar Vieri being sold to Lazio and Italian defenders Michele Serena and Stefano Torrisi being brought in from Fiorentina and Bologna, respectively in addition to defensive Yugoslav midfielders Vladimir Jugović and Zoran Njeguš from Lazio and Red Star Belgrade, respectively. With a focus on defensive tactics, Bogdanović was adjudged as surplus to requirements by Sacchi and sold to Werder Bremen for a fee around €1,350,000.

1998-99 season
Bogdanović made his Bremen debut in Bundesliga on 19 September 1998 away at VfL Wolfsburg, scoring a goal in a 2-4 win.

In December 2000, he was banned from playing for six months after having been ruled to have spit Hansa Rostock's goalkeeper Martin Pieckenhagen in the face during Werder's 5–2 defeat.

He stayed at the German club for four years, winning the 1998–99 DFB-Pokal and the 1998 UEFA Intertoto Cup. In the cup final against Bayern Munich, Bogdanović came on as a substitute and then scored one of the penalties in the shootout as Bremen emerged victorious.

Later years and retirement
In the 2002–03 season, he played for Arminia Bielefeld, and then went to Al Wahda from the United Arab Emirates. After that, he decided to retire from professional football.

International career
Bogdanović played three times and scored two goals for the FR Yugoslavia national team. He was asked to play for the Bosnia and Herzegovina national team, but he chose to play for FR Yugoslavia (Serbia and Montenegro).

Post-playing
Bogdanović tried his hand at and football administration with a few low-profile stints, most notably at Rad and BASK.

Since early 2011, he owns and runs a sports recreation facility, named Posco Arena after his Korean team, in the Belgrade neighbourhood of Careva Ćuprija.

Match-fixing and pay-to-play claims
In April 2011, in an interview for Belgrade daily newspaper Sport, Bogdanović caused controversy by alleging that Atletico's last match of the 1997–98 La Liga season on 15 May 1998 away at Racing Santander was fixed by Atletico president Jesus Gil "because Atletico needed three points to ensure a UEFA Cup spot for the following season". Bogdanović stated: "Gil walked into the dressing room before the match and said that each player has to set aside DM25,000 out of the DM150,000 bonus in order for the win to be bought". The match ended 0–1 for the Madrid visitors.

In various print interviews throughout mid-to-late 2010s, while not naming specific names, retired footballer Bogdanović has made claims about having been offered a spot on the Yugoslavia 1998 FIFA World Cup roster in exchange for paying DM50,000 as part of an alleged pay to play scheme: "After my [summer 1997] Atlético move, which I completed without an agent, I got a call from a well-known Yugoslav coach who got my number through [Atlético head coach] Radomir Antić. This person was most curious as to why I don't handle my business through an agent, basically telling me 'congrats on going from Japan to Atlético and your good run of form, son, but this is not how these things are done: why don't you look into getting yourself an agent and then you can be with us [at the national team]'. Then, ten months later, in April 1998, I got approached by a Yugoslav sports journalist who explained to me that his son is a schoolmate of [Yugoslav FA general-secretary] Bato Bulatović's son. We met up at a restaurant in Skadarlija where this journalist told me he can absolutely guarantee a spot on the upcoming Yugoslavia [1998] World Cup roster for me if I agree to pay DM50,000 before proceeding to name-drop all the players he had already gotten into the national team as well as the players who would supposedly be on the upcoming World Cup roster through him. I refused the offer, but, sure enough, then I saw that the individuals he mentioned did later end up playing for the national team [at the World Cup]. One of the [Yugoslav] players taken to that World Cup hadn't even played for the national team before then."

TV punditry
From the mid 2010s, Bogdanović began appearing as in-studio pundit on Serbian television during football coverage. He quickly marked himself out for outspoken approach and direct manner of speaking.

In November 2019, Bogdanović faced criticism over a racist remark made during RTS' Champions League live coverage. Commenting on poor defending by Borussia Dortmund in a Champions League match against FC Barcelona, he stated that the German team never recovered from manager Lucien Favre's past decision to "play with four blacks in the defensive back line towards the end of the previous Bundesliga season". During the coverage of the same game, Bogdanović further commented on Barcelona's €150 million signing Ousmane Dembélé's time at the Catalan club by claiming that "the Barcelona people hired a nutritionist for the kid to explain to him that he shouldn't be eating fast food before hiring a psychiatrist for him to make him aware that watching porn and organizing online gaming tournaments until early morning isn't a proper lifestyle for a professional footballer" before adding that "the renovation of the Clinical Centre of Serbia costs as much as this guy".

Personal life
Bogdanović and his wife Aleksandra have three children, the oldest daughter is Kristina (born 1 June 1994 in South Korea), the second is called Marija (born 17 October 2000 in Germany) and the third is Sofija (born 26 July 2007 in Spain). Bogdanović and his family reside in Belgrade though they also spend time in Mallorca where he owns an apartment.

Bogdanović's nephews Vladimir Jovančić and Darko Jovančić are also football players.

Career statistics

Club

International

Scores and results list FR Yugoslavia's goal tally first, score column indicates score after each Bogdanović goal.

Honours

Player

Club
Pohang Atoms
K League 1: 1992
Korean FA Cup: 1996 
Korean League Cup: 1993

Werder Bremen
DFB-Pokal: 1998–99
UEFA Intertoto Cup: 1998 (Joint Winner)

Individual
Awards
K League Top Assists Award: 1996
K League Best XI: 1994, 1996

Performance
Korean League Cup Top Scorer: 1994

References

External links
 
 
 
 
 Player Record at Atletico 

1970 births
Living people
Footballers from Sarajevo
Serbs of Bosnia and Herzegovina
Serbian footballers
Yugoslav footballers
Serbia and Montenegro international footballers
Association football forwards
FK Željezničar Sarajevo players
Pohang Steelers players
JEF United Chiba players
Atlético Madrid footballers
NAC Breda players
SV Werder Bremen players
Arminia Bielefeld players
Al Wahda FC players
K League 1 players
J1 League players
La Liga players
Eredivisie players
Bundesliga players
UAE Pro League players
Serbian expatriate footballers
Serbia and Montenegro expatriate footballers
Serbia and Montenegro footballers
Expatriate footballers in South Korea
Expatriate footballers in Japan
Expatriate footballers in Spain
Expatriate footballers in the Netherlands
Expatriate footballers in Germany
Expatriate footballers in the United Arab Emirates
Serbian football managers
Serbia and Montenegro expatriate sportspeople in South Korea
Serbia and Montenegro expatriate sportspeople in Japan
Serbia and Montenegro expatriate sportspeople in Spain
Serbia and Montenegro expatriate sportspeople in the Netherlands
Serbia and Montenegro expatriate sportspeople in Germany
Serbian expatriate sportspeople in the United Arab Emirates